Geneviève Suzanne Marie-Thérèse Mulmann (born 30 August 1932), known professionally as Geneviève de Fontenay, is a French businesswoman who served as the president of the Miss France Committee from 1981 until 2007. After leaving her position with Miss France, Fontenay created the beauty pageant Miss Prestige Nationale in 2010, and served as its president until her retirement in 2016.

Early life and education
Fontenay was born on 30 August 1932 in Longwy, Lorraine, as the daughter of André Mulmann and Marie-Thérèse Martin. The eldest of ten children, her father was a mining engineer at the Hagondange steelworks. Fontenay was educated at a hospitality school in Strasbourg, and later moved to Paris to train as a beautician at age 17. In the 1950s, Fontenay settled in Saint-Cloud with her partner, where she began to work as a fashion designer and model.

Career

Miss France (1954–2010)
Fontenay began her career with the Miss France Committee in 1954, after being hired as its general secretary while the committee was chaired by Guy Rinaldo. Fontenay's partner Louis Poirot became the general delegate of Miss France in 1957, and Fontenay was later hired as his assistant in 1962.

In 2010, Fontenay officially cut ties with Miss France.

President (1981–2007)
Fontenay became the president of the Miss France Committee in 1981, following the death of Poirot, whom had previously held the office. Upon taking control of the organization, Fontenay and her son Xavier Poirot de Fontenay transformed the organization into a company. In 2002, they sold portions of the business to Endemol Shine France, to assist with commercial and television aspects of the organization.

Fontenay ignited controversy in France in the aftermath of Miss France 2008 in December 2007, with the crowning of winner Valérie Bègue. Two weeks following Bègue's victory, clothed but suggestive photos of Bègue were released by the French tabloid Entrevue. After the release of the photos, Fontenay appeared on French radio demanding that Bègue resign her title due to the photos or she would be forcibly dethroned, adding that if Endemol Shine France disagreed with the decision, Fontenay would resign as president. Four years prior, Fontenay had successfully obtained the temporary dismissal of Lætitia Bléger as Miss France 2004, after Bléger posed nude in the French edition of Playboy, although Bléger's title was later reinstated after negotiations. When Bègue refused to resign, Fontenay was accused of racism for stating that Bègue should have stayed in her home region of Réunion, part of overseas France, which led to uproar within Réunion. Fontenay ultimately came to a compromise with Bègue, allowing her to remain Miss France while losing the right to represent France internationally at Miss Universe and Miss World and assist in the crowning of regional titleholders for Miss France 2009.

In the aftermath of the controversy with Bègue, Fontenay left her position as president of the Miss France Committee, while remaining affiliated with the organization. She was replaced by Sylvie Tellier, who began to serve as national director of Miss France, taking on much of the responsibilities previously held by Fontenay as the public face of the competition.

Miss Prestige Nationale (2010–2016)
After severing ties with the Miss France Committee in 2010, Fontenay announced plans to start her own national beauty pageant meant to serve as a competitor to Miss France. Later that year, she launched Miss Nationale, serving as its inaugural president. Following a legal dispute with Michel Le Parmentier, the owner of the Miss Nationale brand, Fontenay confirmed that the pageant would be renamed to Miss Prestige Nationale in 2011. In January 2016, Fontenay stepped down from her role with Miss Prestige Nationale in order to retire from the beauty pageant industry.

Public image

Throughout her time as a public figure, Fontenay cultivated a reputation for her style of dress. Since 1957, Fontenay has continuously worn a brimmed hat in all of her public appearances, while her outfits are almost always made from a black and white color palette. According to Fontenay, she had adopted this style at the advice of her long-term partner Louis Poirot, as he claimed that her head was too small for her body, and a hat would disguise that. The hat has since become Fontenay's trademark, and she became known as la Dame au Chapeau by the French media.

In 2015, Fontenay revealed that she was reportedly offered the Legion of Honour, the highest French order of merit, but declined to be honoured, stating "It's really desacralizing the ribbon to distribute it to anyone, like chocolate medals."

Personal life
Fontenay met Louis Poirot in 1954, who became Fontenay's long-term partner. Despite claiming to be a former French Resistance fighter and journalist, Poirot was a fraudster who had been convicted of fraud and forgery. After beginning their relationship, Poirot began to use the name Louis Poirot de Fontenay professionally, with Fontenay also adopting the de Fontenay surname. The family resided in Saint-Cloud and had two sons together: Ludovic (1954–1984) and Xavier (born 1961). Poirot died in 1981.

Political views
Fontenay has been outspoken about her political beliefs throughout her time as a public figure. Fontenay supported Arlette Laguiller of Lutte Ouvrière in the 2002 French presidential election, Ségolène Royal of the Socialist Party (PS) in the 2007 presidential election, and François Hollande of PS in the 2012 presidential election. She supported Emmanuel Macron in the 2017 presidential election, although she later became a critic of his. Fontenay described her voting history by saying "I have always voted for the left, except when I voted for Jacques Chirac against Le Pen," referring to the second round of the 2002 presidential election. She also initially supported the yellow vests protests, despite eventually opposing the movement due to disruptions to traffic.

Despite her support for left-wing politics, Fontenay has also been outspoken as a social conservative. In 2016, she publicly came out against LGBT parenting, surrogacy, and assisted reproductive technology for same-sex couples, and joined the La Manif pour tous movement campaigning against same-sex marriage in France. In April 2018, she criticized the "anti-social policy" of Macron by joining an initiative led by Florian Philippot of the far-right The Patriots political party, despite later distancing herself from Philippot. In 2019, when Sylvie Tellier stated that she "would not oppose" transgender women taking part in Miss France, Fontenay referred to the idea as "against nature" and "dishonorable," and that it would "dirty the title of Miss France."

References

1932 births
20th-century French businesswomen
20th-century French businesspeople
21st-century French businesswomen
21st-century French businesspeople
Beauty pageant owners
French women company founders
Living people
People from Longwy
Légion d'honneur refusals